Frederick Brindle (Q1 1909 – death unknown) was an English professional rugby league footballer who played in the 1930s and 1940s.

Background
Fred Brindle's birth was registered in Sculcoates district, East Riding of Yorkshire, England.

Playing career

International honours
Fred Brindle won a cap for England while at Huddersfield in 1933 against Other Nationalities.

County honours
Fred Brindle played  in Yorkshire's 9-10 defeat by Lancashire at Athletic Grounds, Rochdale on Saturday 12 February 1938.

County League appearances
Fred Brindle played in Castleford's victory in the Yorkshire County League during the 1938–39 season.

Challenge Cup Final appearances
Fred Brindle played  and scored a try in Huddersfield's 21–17 victory over Warrington in the 1933 Challenge Cup Final during the 1932–33 season at Wembley Stadium, London on Saturday 6 May 1933.

References

External links

1909 births
Castleford Tigers players
England national rugby league team players
English rugby league players
Huddersfield Giants players
Hull Kingston Rovers players
People from Sculcoates
Place of death missing
Rugby league locks
Rugby league players from Kingston upon Hull
Yorkshire rugby league team players
Year of death missing